Kampochora or Kampos, literally plain, is a former municipality on the island of Chios, North Aegean, Greece. Since the 2011 local government reform it is part of the municipality Chios, of which it is a municipal unit. It is located in the south-central part of the island. It has a land area of 50.571 km². Its population was 2,897 at the 2011 census. The seat of the municipality was in Chalkeio (pop. 950).  Other large towns include Ágios Geórgios Sykoúsis (579), Dafnón (385), and Vasileónoikon (377).

The area started to develop since the Genoese rule of the island in 13th century, when the most wealthy Chiot Greek and Genoese families started to building their houses.

Gallery

References

Populated places in Chios

bg:Камбохора (дем)